Antonio Maeso (born 1 January 1979) is a Spanish motorcycling racer who was born in Madrid but moved to live in Almería, Andalusia as a child.

Early life
Antonio Maeso's motorcycling career started when he was just four years old and his father bought a small dirt bike for him.  Although he started off-road racing very young, it was not until he was 15 that he entered his first road race. He participated in the 50 cc, 80 cc, and 125 cc categories until 2002, winning 4 county championships. He then moved to Superbikes, racing a Yamaha R1.  Twice Spanish winner of the R1 Yamaha Cup, Maeso has been contesting the National level Superbike championship (called Extreme in Spain) since then.  In 2007 he was a newcomer to the Isle of Man Tourist Trophy races, getting two finishing medals. He continued to compete in the hardest races in the world and in 2009 he came out with a 17th final position at the Senior TT race, lapping at 122,6 mph. For 2010 he will be one of the riders on the starting grid for the TT, competing in all solo classes.

Personal record 

 height: 173 cm
 weight: 68 kg "wet"
 Studies: High Technician of International Trade and Marketing and in Business Management & Marketing, Commercial English Technician.

List of victories 
From 1995 to the present, Maeso has achieved victories in all national categories − 50 cc, 80 cc, 125 cc, in the Superbikes Regional Championship, and the Yamaha R1 Spanish Championship. He was the first Spaniard in more than 30 years to race in the Isle of Man, competing in the TT races there.

2007 

 Award for competing and finishing two races at the Isle of Man TT
 Formula Extreme Spanish Championship

2006 
 Formula Extreme Spanish Championship

2005 
 Formula Extreme Spanish Championship

2003 
 Yamaha R1 Challenge Cup National Final Champion
 Champion of the Andalucía  Fam Series Championship (1000c.C.)
 Champion of Challenge Yamaha-Cepsa Andalucía R1

2002 
 Champion of the  Almería  Supermotard Championship
 Champion of the  Almería  Scooters 50 C.C. Championship

2001 
 Champion of the National Final of Yamaha R1 Challenge
 Second Classified of the Fórmula Campeones cat "Motociclismo Superseries"
 Champion of the Andalucía  Fam Series Championship (600-1000c.C.)
 Champion of Challenge Yamaha-Cepsa Andalucía R1

2000 
 Champion of Challenge Yamaha-Cepsa Andalucía R1
 Champion of Regional of Murcia De 80 C.C Scooters
 Second Classified of Regional De Murcia Automatics 50 C.C.

1998 
 Champion of Regional De Murcia 125 C.C. Production
 Second Classified of Trofeo Interautonómico Castilla La Mancha-Murcia 125 C.C. Production

1997 
 Champion of the Open 125 C.C. Production
 Champion of the Castilla La Mancha 125 C.C. Production
 Second Classified of the Regional of Murcia 125 C.C. Production
 Second Classified of the Regional of Murcia 250 Gran Prix
 21 Clas. European Championship 250 Gran Prix

1996 
 Champion of the Murcia 125 C.C. Production Championship

1995 
 Champion of the  Andalucía 125 C.C. Production Championship

External links 
 Web of maeso34
 Motorcycling Dyno
 Official web TT Isle of Man
 Pictures of Maeso

Spanish motorcycle racers
Living people
Sportspeople from Madrid
1979 births